Rameshwar Thakur (28 July 1925 – 15 January 2015) was a politician and former union minister of India, he also served as the Governor of Madhya Pradesh from 2009 to 2011, Governor of Odisha from 2004 to 2006, Governor of Andhra Pradesh from 2006 to 2007 and Governor of Karnataka from 2007 to 2009. He was a Chartered Accountant. He was also President of the Institute of Chartered Accountants of India from 1966 to 1967.

Biography
Thakur was born in the village of Thakur Gangti, Godda District, Jharkhand. He had participated in Quit India movement. He served as President of the Bharat Scouts and Guides from November 1998 to November 2001, and again after November 2004. Thakur was sworn-in as the 15th Governor of Karnataka on August 21, 2007.

He was transferred to Governor Madhya Pradesh for the remainder of his gubernatorial term on June 24, 2009. Thakur took over from Balram Jakhar on the end of the latter's term on June 30. He left office on September 7, 2011.
Rameswar died on 15 January 2015 at Delhi.

He was married to Narmada Thakur and they had two sons and two daughters: Mridula, Sangeeta, Sushil and Anil Thakur.

See also
 V Rajaraman

References

External links
 Choosing the Next Secretary-General of the United Nations - Article by Ramesh Thakur on MUNPlanet 
 Profile on Odisha Govt website
 Profile on Andhra Pradesh Govt website
 
 

People from Godda district
University of Calcutta alumni
Governors of Odisha
Governors of Andhra Pradesh
Indian accountants
Governors of Karnataka
Scouting and Guiding in India
1925 births
2015 deaths
Governors of Madhya Pradesh
Jharkhand politicians